or  (Old English for "Night of the Mothers" or "Mothers' Night") was an event held at what is now Christmas Eve by heathen Anglo-Saxon. The event is solely attested by the medieval English historian Bede in his eighth-century Latin work . It has been suggested that sacrifices may have occurred during this event.

Attestation
In , Bede writes that the pagan Anglo-Saxons:

Theories and interpretations
Scholars have linked these  ("Mothers") with the Germanic .

Scholars have placed the event as a part of the Germanic winter period of Yule.

Regarding Bede's attestation, Philip A. Shaw commented in 2011 that "the fact that Bede's  can be to some extent confirmed by the Romano-Germanic votive inscriptions to matrons does at least indicate that we should not be too quick to dismiss the other evidence he provides for Anglo-Saxon deities".

See also
 
 
 Triple deity
 
 Yule

Notes

References

 Giles, John Allen (1843). The Complete Works of the Venerable Bede, in the Original Latin, Collated with the Manuscripts, and Various Print Editions, Accompanied by a New English Translation of the Historical Works, and a Life of the Author. Vol. VI: Scientific Tracts and Appendix. London: Whittaker and Co., Ave Maria Lane.
 Herbert, Kathleen (2007). Looking for the Lost Gods of England. Anglo-Saxon Books. 
 Orchard, Andy (1997). Dictionary of Norse Myth and Legend. Cassell. 
 Shaw, Philip A. (2011). Pagan Goddesses in the Early Germanic World. Bristol Classical Press. 
 Simek, Rudolf (2007) translated by Angela Hall. Dictionary of Northern Mythology.  D. S. Brewer. 
 Wallis, Faith (Trans.) (1999). Bede: The Reckoning of Time. Liverpool University Press. 

Anglo-Saxon paganism
December observances
Events in Norse mythology